Capitol View is a historic in-town southwest Atlanta neighborhood 2.5 miles from downtown Atlanta, Georgia that was named for its view of the Georgia State Capitol building. Its boundaries include Metropolitan Parkway to the east, Lee Street to the west, and the Beltline to the north. On the south, the border follows Arden Street, Deckner Avenue, and Perkerson Park.  

Capitol View is filled with a housing stock of 1915-1925 of craftsman bungalows as well as earlier Queen Anne houses that precede the planned development of the neighborhood. Several of the Queen Annes on Metropolitan Avenue were built by the Deckner family, for whom Decker Avenue is named. Many of the historic homes are rapidly being renovated as the neighborhood continues to revitalize and attract new residents.

History

Early history

In the first and second decades of the 1900s, the residential area now known as Capitol View was little more than a farm and pasture owned primarily by A.P. Stewart, "Uncle John" Shannon and the Deckner family. There were no paved streets, no electric lights and no sewage system.

In 1858, the 12 charter members of Capitol View Baptist Church (then located on Beatie Avenue) went to church by lantern light. About 1912, the church was organized as a mission under the Second Baptist Church of Atlanta. Between 1910 and 1914, the community began growing, largely due to the addition of a Masonic Temple and pharmacy to the area. By 1913, utilities were installed and Capitol View was annexed in the City of Atlanta.

The early 20th century trolley system revolutionized Capitol View and led to streets laid out in a grid pattern that has a longer north-south axis than east-west.

Commercial activity is concentrated along Dill Avenue, with a major commercial intersection at Dill and Metropolitan Parkway. This intersection has two prominent buildings, the 1921 Masonic Temple and the 1927 Capitol View Baptist Church (demolished in 2016) as well as several smaller commercial buildings.

Urban Renewal

In the late 1990s, Stewart Avenue was renamed Metropolitan Parkway in an effort to shake the street's unfortunate reputation as a haven of crime and prostitution. Since then Dill Ave restored the area have helped to increase property values and reduce crime. The approval of a Tax-allocation district for Metropolitan Parkway (although it does not include the Capitol View area) should help to revitalize a long-neglected business corridor. The redevelopment of the nearby Fort McPherson into a mixed use development/movie studio in the future will provide employment opportunities for existing and new residents. MARTA is also in the process of transitioning the Oakland City MARTA station into a transit-oriented development by converting existing parking lots into condos, apartments, and storefronts.

With the 2014 construction of the Beltline, the rising trend toward city living, and the new Metropolitan Branch library, Capitol View appears to be on a track for revitalization like many other in-town Atlanta neighborhoods.

BeltLine Westside Trail
The Atlanta BeltLine runs through the northern part of the Capitol View neighborhood, dropping south from Adair Park and crossing Metropolitan Avenue just north of Erin Avenue (in fact, that's the BeltLine bridge that you drive under on Metropolitan). From there, the BeltLine heads into neighboring Capitol View Manor.

In September 2013, the City of Atlanta was awarded an $18 million TIGER V grant from the U.S. Department of Transportation to develop the southwest corridor of the Atlanta BeltLine. In the second half of 2014, construction will commence on the 3-mile Westside Trail. The 3-mile Westside trail will run along the northern edge of Capitol View from University Avenue in Adair Park north to Lena Avenue at Washington Park in West End. For a half mile along White Street, the trail will use the existing West End Trail. The project funding includes 14 points of entry (11 of which will be ADA-accessible) with ramp and stair systems, greenway, and preservation for future transit. The construction is expected to start in the fall of 2014.

The Atlanta BeltLine Westside Trail groundbreaking took place on Wednesday, November 12 at 10:30 a.m. The Westside Trail, the next major milestone for the Atlanta BeltLine’s network of trails, transit, parks and green space will be a three-mile addition running from University Avenue in Adair Park to Lena Street at Washington Park. The design of the Westside Trail project was led by Atlanta BeltLine, Inc. in partnership with the Georgia Department of Transportation and support from a design team led by Kimley-Horn and Associates, Inc. The initial phase of a project this complex normally takes two years to complete. Yet the process took only nine months with the help of a unique partnership between the City of Atlanta, the Georgia Department of Transportation, the USDOT Federal Highway Administration, Atlanta BeltLine, Inc. and its design team.  Construction of this project is expected to take approximately 24 months.

When completed, the Westside Trail will have a 14-foot wide concrete multi-use trail in this historic railroad corridor.  The project will also include the construction of 14 access points, 11 of which are ADA-accessible, along with lighting, security cameras, signage, way-finding, mile-markers, and underground infrastructure.  An expansion of the Atlanta BeltLine arboretum will blend with hundreds of large, native trees and integrate more than 30 acres of inviting and usable new green space. The project will be constructed in preparation for future transit that is currently in the planning stages. The Westside Trail connects four schools and four parks, as well as the residents of 10 southwest Atlanta neighborhoods to public transit, existing community businesses and future economic development sites.

Neighborhood Association

Mission
Capitol View Neighborhood Association (CVNA) exists to improve the quality of life for Capitol View residents and to preserve, restore, and rejuvenate the neighborhood.

Community involvement includes subcommittees involved in Safety & Quality of Life, Communication and Engagement, and Economic Development. Activities are regularly held in Perkerson Park. Capital View is a lively front porch neighborhood. 

Meetings are held monthly.

Transportation

Capitol View is located just a few miles from Downtown Atlanta, Midtown Atlanta, Buckhead, College Park, East Point, Hartsfield-Jackson Atlanta International Airport, and major highways and interstates such as the Downtown Connector/I-75/I-85, I-20, and Metropolitan Parkway.

Public Transportation
Capitol View is located directly on the Red/Gold Lines of the MARTA Train Rail with a neighborhood stop at the Oakland City Train Station. This allows easy public transit options to the Atlanta area and beyond. In addition, Marta Bus stops line the perimeter of the neighborhood and surrounding areas.

Oakland City MARTA Station layout

Housing
Most homes in Capitol View were built during the first half of the twentieth century. Earlier home styles were primarily Country Victorians and Craftsman Bungalows while later housing stock included Cape Cods and Colonials.  Most houses feature wide front porches and back decks looking out on spacious yards. Currently, houses in the neighborhood ran the gamut of fixer-uppers to fully renovated to brand new home construction.

Prices reflect the condition of the property and as of December 2022 range from $200,000 to $550,000. The neighborhood also has several industrial buildings which have been converted to lofts and are a part of the Coeur D'Allene loft complex.

Parks and Recreation

Capitol View is located between Perkerson Park and the proposed Atlanta Beltline park system. Perkerson is a  park with a large pavilion and several other picnic facilities. A new playground was recently installed during a renovation of the park's recreation center. In March 2010, the Friends of Perkerson Park, a community volunteer group, hosted the first "Spring Forward Festival" which raised money to make improvements to the park.

The park also features the following sport amenities:
Basketball courts
Tennis courts
Baseball, Softball, and Little League fields
Sprayground

Perkerson Park is home to the only permanent disc golf course in the city of Atlanta.

Capitol View is also between two of the six targeted economic development areas on the Atlanta Beltline: Murphy's Crossing, directly north of Capitol View, and University/Metropolitan to the east.

Education

Atlanta Public Schools

The Atlanta Public Schools for the neighborhood are:
Perkerson Elementary School
Sylvan Hills Middle School
Carver High School

Colleges and Universities
In addition, many colleges are located within a few miles of Capitol View. These include:
Atlanta Technical College
Atlanta Metropolitan College
Morehouse College
Clark Atlanta University
Georgia State University
Georgia Institute of Technology
Georgia Perimeter College

Metropolitan Library

The Atlanta–Fulton Public Library System is currently building the Southwest Atlanta Branch Library in the neighborhood at 1332 Metropolitan Parkway, Atlanta, GA 30310. The Library System is engaged in a $275 million building program, funded by a library bond referendum approved by Fulton County voters in 2008. The project is divided into two phases.

Phase I of the Library Building Program consists of 10 projects, 8 new libraries – Alpharetta, East Roswell, Metropolitan, Milton, Northwest Atlanta, Palmetto, Southeast Atlanta, and Wolf Creek – and 2 expanded libraries – Auburn Avenue Research Library on African American Culture and History and South Fulton – with a total budget of $167 million; these dollars include everything from design and construction to funding for collections. Also, each library project includes a public art component, through the Fulton County Public Art Program.

References

External links
Official Capitol View Neighborhood Association Website
Map of Capitol View from Wikimapia
Atlanta Public Schools

Neighborhoods in Atlanta